Dillon Aero, Inc. is an armament manufacturer in Scottsdale, Arizona, USA.

Minigun

Dillon Aero manufactures the Air Force GAU-2B/A (Army M134) 7.62×51mm minigun, which is used primarily by 160th SOAR. The company completely redesigned the weapon and significantly improved its reliability while reducing its weight.

Company 

Dillon Aero is owned by the Dillon family, who also own Dillon Precision, a manufacturer of reloading presses and other reloading equipment, as well as Dillon Optics, a sunglasses manufacturer.

References

External links
Dillon Aero Home
GovernmentContractsWon.com

Firearm manufacturers of the United States